Fadette is a 1926 German silent historical film directed by Frederic Zelnik and starring Lya Mara, Yvette Guilbert and Eugen Klöpfer.

The film's sets were designed by the art directors Andrej Andrejew and Alexander Ferenczy.

Cast
 Lya Mara as Die kleine Fadette
 Yvette Guilbert as Die alte Fadette
 Eugen Klöpfer as Barbeau
 Harry Liedtke as Landry
 Ernö Verebes as Sylvaine
 Eugen Burg as Baron Rothschild
 Dagny Servaes as George Sand
 Alfred Abel as Chopin
 Rudolf Klein-Rogge as Rossini
 Max Grünberg as Heinrich Heine
 Hanns Waschatko as Paganini
 Ferdinand von Alten as the Duke of Orleans
 Wilhelm Diegelmann as Der Wirt
 Hermann Picha as Ein alter Bauer
 Harry Berber
 Karl Etlinger
 Karl Platen
 Berta Scheven
 Hans Heinrich von Twardowski

References

Bibliography
 Grange, William. Cultural Chronicle of the Weimar Republic. Scarecrow Press, 2008.

External links 
 

1926 films
1920s historical films
German historical films
Films of the Weimar Republic
German silent feature films
Films directed by Frederic Zelnik
Films based on French novels
German black-and-white films
Films based on works by George Sand
1920s German films